The 2008 Notre Dame Fighting Irish football team represented the University of Notre Dame in the 2008 NCAA Division I FBS football season. The team was coached by Charlie Weis and played its home games at Notre Dame Stadium in South Bend, Indiana. This was Weis's fourth season as Notre Dame's head coach, who entered the season with a 22–15 record, coming off a 3–9 season after posting back-to-back BCS seasons.

The Irish started 4–1, but completed the regular season with a 6–6 record, including a 24–23 loss to Syracuse, the first time that Notre Dame had fallen to an eight-loss team. The combined 15 losses from 2007 to 2008 marks the most losses for any two-year span. Despite speculation the university might fire Weis, it was announced shortly after the conclusion of the regular season that he would remain head coach in 2009. Notre Dame ended the season on a positive note, finally ending their NCAA record nine-game bowl losing streak by beating Hawaii 49–21.  In the process, Notre Dame scored its highest point total of the season, its highest point total ever in a bowl game, and broke 8 other bowl records. The bowl win also helped Notre Dame to a 7–6 final record, its 102nd winning season in 120 years of football.

Pre-season

Coaching changes
Despite the turmoil of the previous football season, head coach Charlie Weis did not make many changes to the coaching staff. The one major change to the staff was the addition of Jon Tenuta, former defensive coordinator of the Georgia Tech Yellow Jackets, as the new linebackers coach and assistant head coach. Tetuna became responsible for the day-to-day operations of the team with Weis retaining responsibility only for recruiting.  Tenuta's addition followed the retirement of Bill Lewis from active coaching. Other changes included reassignment of football duties. Weis announced that he would be turning over control of the offense, including game day play calling, to offensive coordinator Michael Haywood. On defense, Corwin Brown switched from coaching linebackers to coaching defensive backs following Lewis' retirement. Tenuta assumed coaching the linebackers. Finally, citing the poor play on special teams, Weis made Brian Polian the sole special teams coach and announced that he would be helping Polian when needed. The previous year, all coaches had a hand in helping with special teams.

Roster changes

Graduating players
Seniors tight end John Carlson, defensive end Trevor Laws, safety Tom Zbikowski and center John Sullivan were all drafted by NFL teams. Three players that were not drafted quickly signed with NFL teams as free agents following the NFL Draft: linebacker Joe Brockington, long snapper J. J. Jansen and running back Travis Thomas. Quarterbacks Darrin Bragg and Justin Gillett, defensive end Dwight Stephenson Jr., cornerback Ambrose Wooden and punter Geoff Price also graduated and exhausted their remaining eligibility.  Notre Dame also had several players who graduated and decided not to apply for a fifth year of eligibility: running back Junior Jabbie, cornerback Leo Ferine and linebacker Anthony Vernaglia.

Transfers
After the end of the spring practice session, sophomore-to-be linebacker Aaron Nagel transferred from Notre Dame to the Northwestern Wildcats. In July, wide receiver D.J. Hord announced he was transferring from Notre Dame to a yet unnamed Division I Football Championship Subdivision school, where he would have two years eligibility remaining.  Once a highly touted recruit, injuries had hampered his progress and he left with 2 catches for 7 yards in his Notre Dame career.  It was also announced the same day that starting cornerback Darin Walls would not enroll and play football this season for undisclosed personal reasons, but would return the following spring.  On August, 15, several days into fall practice, reserve wide receiver Richard Jackson announced he would be leaving Notre Dame for a school closer to his home in Florida.

Recruiting
The Irish added 23 players to its roster with high school recruits. Included in the class were five-star wide receiver recruit Michael Floyd, five-star quarterback recruit Dayne Crist, and five-star defensive lineman Ethan Johnson. Five-star tight end Kyle Rudolph also bolstered a class that included six four star recruits on offense, and nine four star recruits on defense. The class was named No. 2 by both Rivals and Scout. Rivals revised Notre Dame's ranking to No. 1 after factoring in players recruited by other schools that did not enroll with their classmates.

Award candidates
The following players were announced to award watch lists prior to the start of the 2008 season:

David Bruton – Bronko Nagurski Trophy
Jimmy Clausen – Maxwell Award
Maurice Crum Jr.  – Bronko Nagurski Trophy, Chuck Bednarik Award

Schedule

Roster

Coaching staff

Game summaries

San Diego State

Notre Dame able to put up 14 unanswered points in the 4th quarter to down San Diego State. Notre Dame stalled out multiple times throughout the game due to turnovers, but the Notre Dame defense stood up to Ryan Lindley and the Aztec offense forcing the Aztecs to fumble inside the ND 5 yard line while they were leading by 6 in the 4th quarter. The Irish only allowed 13 points through the entire game and came back in the fourth to open the season with a win.

Michigan

Turnovers were the name of the game, as Notre Dame jumped out to a 21-point lead off of 2 early Michigan turnovers and went on to beat Michigan 35–17.  Despite Michigan out-gaining the Irish 387 yards to 260 yards, Notre Dame won the turnover battle 6 to 2. Jimmy Clausen connected on touchdown passes of 10 yards and 48 yards to wide receivers Duval Kamara and Golden Tate, respectively. Michigan came to life after the 21 points, when Sam McGuffie turned a short pass from quarterback Steven Threet into a 40-yard touchdown. Michigan kicker K.C. Lopata's 23 yard field goal cut the lead to 21–10. The Irish then answered with an 87-yard touchdown drive, highlighted by a 60-yard pass from Clausen to Tate, who broke three tackles before being caught at the 25 yard line. Robert Hughes scored his second rushing touchdown of the day, a 1-yard run to make it 28–10.

Irish linebacker Brian Smith also returned a fumble 35 yards for a touchdown in the fourth quarter to put the game away. Notre Dame didn't come away completely unscathed, however, as coach Charlie Weis was knocked over on the sideline by defensive end John Ryan, who was being run out of bounds. Weis spent the remainder of the game on crutches with his left leg wrapped. It was determined during halftime that Weis had torn his ACL and his MCL. Coach Lou Holtz and the 1988 National Title team were also honored, with a statue of Coach Holtz unveiled outside of the stadium before the game.

Michigan State

Purdue

Notre Dame improved to 3–1, matching its win total from a year ago with a 38–21 victory over Purdue.
 Jimmy Clausen threw for a career-high 275 yards and three touchdowns and Notre Dame running backs ran for 201 yards. The Irish offense improved on the 16 rushing yards gained against MSU, with starting running back Armando Allen Jr. running for a career-best 134 yards and a touchdown against the Boilermakers. After Purdue took a 7–0 lead on a Kory Sheets run, freshman cornerback Robert J. Blanton started the Irish scoring on a 47-yard interception return for a touchdown. Purdue answered back when Aaron Valentin scored on a 3-yard pass from Curtis Painter to make it 14–7. Jimmy Clausen threw his first touchdown pass to Golden Tate to tie it 14–14 heading into half-time.

The Irish, who hadn't scored in the third quarter in their first three games, scored on their first two possessions of the second half to open a 28–14 lead. The Boilermakers cut the lead to 28–21 four plays later when Painter threw a pass that Desmond Tardy caught at the Notre Dame 30 and raced up the left sideline for a touchdown. The Irish answered immediately, however, when Clausen threw a 30-yard TD pass to captain David Grimes on a fourth-and-7. Freshman wide receiver Michael Floyd added six catches for 100 yards and freshman tight end Kyle Rudolph also had a touchdown catch. The Boilermakers fell to 1–15 at Notre Dame Stadium since 1976. The loss also left Purdue coach Joe Tiller, who is retiring after the season, with a 5–7 record against the Irish.

Stanford

Notre Dame got off to a quick start against Stanford, scoring 3 touchdowns in the first half to hold on to beat Stanford 28–21. Jimmy Clausen threw for a career-high 347 yards, completing 73% of his passes and three touchdown passes and leading Notre Dame to its seventh straight win over the Cardinal. Stanford, however, made a game of it, scoring twice in the fourth quarter to cut Notre Dame's lead to 7. Cardinal quarterback Tavita Pritchard threw a 1-yard pass to Jim Dray and a 10-yard TD pass to Doug Baldwin with 6 minutes left in the game. The Cardinal got the ball back on their own 2-yard line with 3:34 left, but could not mount a drive. They had one last chance with 8 seconds left, but fumbled the ball and defensive end Pat Kuntz recovered to end the game. Kuntz also had an interception and two sacks in the game.

Freshman and Sophomores again accounted for all of Notre Dame's scoring, highlighted by a second straight 100 -yard game by Michael Floyd, who had 5 catches for 115 yards and a 48-yard touchdown catch. Sophomore running back Armando Allen amassed 153 total yards, including scoring a 3-yard rushing touchdown and a 21-yard touchdown pass from Clausen. Freshman tight end Kyle Rudolph also had 5 catches for 70 yards and a touchdown. Running back Toby Gerhart had a great day running the ball for the Cardinal, compiling 104 yards on 13 carries. Tavita Pritchard, however, turned the ball over 3 times, throwing interceptions to Notre Dame safeties David Bruton and Kyle McCarthy in addition to Kuntz. Before the game, Stanford offensive lineman Chris Marinelli made some controversial comments about Notre Dame (which he later apologized for), saying that "I hate it, playing [Notre Dame] up there. The field, excuse my language, the field sucks. The stadium sucks. I think the area sucks." Stanford has not won at Notre Dame stadium since 1992.

North Carolina

Washington

James Aldridge ran for 84 yards and a career-high 2 touchdowns to help the Irish defeat Ty Willingham's winless Huskies 33–7.  The Irish, coming off a bye week, scored touchdowns on their first two possessions of the game. On the third play from scrimmage, Jimmy Clausen connected with Michael Floyd for a 51-yard touchdown. On Notre Dame's next series, Golden Tate capped off a 9 play drive with a 21-yard rushing touchdown, the first of his career.  Clausen completed 14 of 26 passes for 201 yards and interception in addition to his touchdown to Floyd. Clausen missed on 10 of his first 16 passes against a team ranked last in the nation in pass efficiency defense. Notre Dame had no problem creating offense, though, outgaining UW 238 yards to 38 yards in the first half and leading 17–0.

On the first offensive series of the third quarter, the Irish turned to Aldridge, who scored the first of his two touchdowns to put Notre Dame up 24–0. Aldridge led a running back corps that gained 252 yards on the ground. Notre Dame also relied on a stout defense, which held Washington to 124 yards of offense after allowing an average of 368 yards on the season. Washington did not cross midfield until the 6:05 mark in the fourth quarter against ND's second string defense. Huskie quarterback Ronnie Fouch connected with D'Andre Goodwin for a 6-yard touchdown with four minutes left in the game to avoid UW's first shutout loss at Husky Stadium since 1976 (a 7–0 loss against Cal).

Notre Dame's defeat dropped Willingham to 11–32 in three-plus seasons at Washington. It was announced the next day that UW would not be renewing Willingham's contract at the end of the season.

Pittsburgh

In what became the longest game in Notre Dame Stadium history, the Irish came up short against the Panthers, losing 36–33 in quadruple overtime.  The game looked to be a defensive struggle early, with the game tied at 3–3 with a little over four minutes remaining before half time. Late in the second quarter on 3rd down and 12, Golden Tate made a 47-yard catch of a tipped ball to get the Irish offense to the Pitt 32-yard line. Jimmy Clausen hit Michael Floyd 4 plays later to put the Irish up 10–3. With 1:27 left, Panthers quarterback Pat Bostick threw the first of his three interceptions on the day; a 43-yard interception return by Raeshon McNeil. Clausen hit Floyd again for an Irish touchdown with :04 remaining, putting ND up 17–3 at the half.

Despite the Irish's offensive spark in the second quarter, the Panthers held Notre Dame to a mere 7 yards in the third quarter. The Panthers also answered the call on offense scoring 14 unanswered points to tie the game at 17–17. After the second Panther score, Notre Dame's offense came alive again, driving 75 yards in 12 plays and culminating in a third Clausen touchdown, this time to Golden Tate. The late drive by Notre Dame was for nought, however, as Pitt forced overtime when they tied the score at 24 with 2:22 left on a 10-yard touchdown pass from Bostick to Jonathan Baldwin on fourth-and-6. The Panthers ran the same play three straight times before Bostick beat Irish cornerback McNeil for the score.

Neither team could get into the end zone in overtime, and Pitt's Connor Lee won the kicking contest. Notre Dame's kicker, Brandon Walker, who started the season by making just 1-of-7 field goals, made his first four attempts to run his consecutive made field goal streak to seven. But his 38-yard attempt narrowly missed wide left in the fourth overtime, giving Pitt the chance kick the winning field goal.

In the defeat, Notre Dame's Michael Floyd broke the record for catches by a Notre Dame freshman, with 10 catches for 100 yards.

Boston College

Navy

Syracuse

USC

Hawaii Bowl

Notre Dame beat Hawaii 49–21 in its first bowl victory since the Irish defeated Texas A&M in the 1994 Cotton Bowl Classic to end the 1993 season. Irish quarterback Jimmy Clausen broke school bowl game records after passing for 401 yards and five touchdowns, and his 84.6% completion rate was the second-best completion percentage for any player in any bowl game in NCAA history. Wide receiver Golden Tate also set Irish bowl records upon catching for 177 yards and three touchdowns. Both players were named co-MVPs of the game.

In all, Notre Dame broke 9 bowl records in the victory. In addition to Clausen and Tate's record day, Notre Dame set bowl records in total offense (481 yards), scoring (49 points), and longest kick return (96 yards by Allen). Clausen's 69-yard connection to Tate is also a new record. The defense also had a good day for the Irish, registering 8 sacks and an interception. The victory also ties the 1978 Cotton Bowl Classic for Notre Dame's largest margin of victory in a bowl game at 28 points.

Statistics

Team

Scores by quarter

Offense

Rushing

Passing

Receiving

Defense

Special teams

Post season

Awards
Freshman Tight End Kyle Rudolph would earn Freshman All-America First-Team honors for his play as the starting tight end from Sporting News, CollegeFootballNews.com and Phil Steele. Rudolph set freshman school records for receptions and receiving yards logging 25 receptions for 262 yards and two touchdowns. Freshman Receiver Michael Floyd also earned all-freshman second-team honors from Sporting News, CollegeFootballNews.com, Rivals.com and Phil Steele. Offensive guard Trevor Robinson was named to the All-Freshman second team by CollegeFootballNews.com, while wide receiver Golden Tate was a sophomore honorable mention selection.

NFL Draft
David Bruton was the only player drafted from the team, going in the fourth round to the Denver Broncos as the 114th pick overall. Five more players would sign quickly after the draft, including David Grimes with Broncos, Pat Kuntz with the Colts, Terrail Lambert with the 49ers, and fullback Asaph Schwapp and offensive lineman Mike Turkovich with the Cowboys.

References

Notre Dame
Notre Dame Fighting Irish football seasons
Hawaii Bowl champion seasons
Notre Dame Fighting Irish football